St. Dominic High School can refer to:

St. Dominic High School (O'Fallon, Missouri)
St. Dominic High School (Oyster Bay, New York)
St. Dominic Regional High School in Auburn, Maine
St. Dominic High School (Taiwan)
 St. Dominic Catholic Secondary School (Bracebridge, Ontario)

See also
St Dominic (disambiguation)